HMS Whiting was a Palmer three funnel, 30 knot destroyer ordered by the Royal Navy under the 1896 – 1897 Naval Estimates.  She was the fifth ship to carry this name.

Construction
She was laid down on 13 April 1896 at the Palmer shipyard at Jarrow-on-Tyne and launched on 26 August 1896.  During her builder's trials she made her contracted speed requirement.  She was completed and accepted by the Royal Navy in June 1897.

Service history

Pre-War
On 26 June 1897 Whiting was present at the Royal Naval Review at Spithead in celebration of Queen Victoria's Diamond Jubilee. In 1897 she was deployed to the China Station and remained there for the rest of her service life.

This resulted in the capture of four Chinese destroyers including Hai Lung (renamed HMS Taku).

Lieutenant Charles Pleydell Mansel was appointed in command in July 1902, but was succeeded by Lieutenant Harry Lionel Wells already the next month, on 18 August 1902. Her boilers were re-tubed and her hull and machinery were refitted in 1903.

During the summer of 1911 she was at Nanking during the Revolution in China and from there she moved on to Kiu Kiang and Hankow.

On 30 August 1912 the Admiralty directed all destroyer classes were to be designated by alpha characters starting with the letter 'A'.  Since her design speed was 30-knots and she had three funnels she was assigned to the C class.  After 30 September 1913, she was known as a C-class destroyer and had the letter ‘C’ painted on the hull below the bridge area and on either the fore or aft funnel.

World War I
In August 1914 Whiting was on the disposal list but with the commencement of hostilities she remained on China Station for the duration of the First World War.

In 1919 she was paid off and laid-up in reserve awaiting disposal.  Whiting was sold for breaking on 27 November 1919 in Hong Kong.

She was awarded the Battle Honour "China 1900" for her participation in operations during the Chinese Boxer Rebellion.

References
Note:  All tabular data under General Characteristics only from the listed Jane's Fighting Ships volume unless otherwise specified

Bibliography
 
 
 
 
 
 
 
 

 

Ships built on the River Tyne
1896 ships
C-class destroyers (1913)
World War I destroyers of the United Kingdom